Verhuellia is a genus of flowering plants belonging to the family Piperaceae. Verhuellia is a sister genus to all other Piperaceae, but has its own subfamily of Verhuellioideaea.

It is native to Cuba and Hispaniola (the Dominican Republic and Haiti).

Known species
As accepted by Kew:
 Verhuellia hydrocotylifolia (Griseb.) C.DC. ex C.Wright 
 Verhuellia lunaria (Ham.) C.DC. 
 Verhuellia pellucida F.Schmitz 

The genus name of Verhuellia is in honour of Quirijn Maurits Rudolph Ver Huell (1787–1860), a Dutch rear admiral, illustrator and entomologist. 
It was first described and published in Syst. Piperac. on page 47 in 1843.

References

Piperaceae
Piperales genera
Plants described in 1843
Flora of Cuba
Flora of the Dominican Republic
Flora of Haiti